Untraceable is a 2008 American psychological thriller film directed by Gregory Hoblit and starring Diane Lane, Colin Hanks, Billy Burke, and Joseph Cross. It was distributed by Screen Gems.

Set in Portland, Oregon, the film involves a serial killer who rigs contraptions that kill his victims based on the number of hits received by a website, KillWithMe.com, that features a live streaming video of the victim. Millions of people log on, hastening the victims' deaths.

Plot
FBI Special Agent Jennifer Marsh is a widowed single parent living in a suburban Portland home with her daughter, Annie Haskins, and her mother, Stella Marsh. At night, she works in the FBI's cybercrime division with Griffin Dowd, fighting identity theft and similar crimes. One night, an anonymous tip leads them to a website called KillWithMe.com. The site features a streaming video of a cat being tortured and killed. The website cannot be shut down, as the creator knew that someone would try, and built into it a fail-safe; every time the server is closed, a mirror server immediately replaces it.

After the cat's death, KillWithMe.com's webmaster graduates to human victims, kidnapping them and placing them in death traps that are progressively activated by the number of hits the website receives. The first victim is a helicopter pilot Herbert Miller (bled to death by injections of anticoagulant), followed by a newscaster David Williams (burnt to death by heat lamps while cemented into the floor). At a press conference, the public is urged to avoid the website, but as Jennifer feared, this only increases the site's popularity.

Griffin is kidnapped after investigating a lead based on his hunch as to the killer's identity and receiving a phone call from the killer disguising his voice and posing as one of Griffin's jilted blind dates. In the killer's basement, he is submerged up to his neck in a vat of water with his mouth taped shut; the death trap introduces into the water a concentration of sulfuric acid. After the killer leaves the room, Griffin uses his dying moments to blink a message in morse code, giving the FBI the lead he was following up on.

Jennifer follows up on the morse code message to discover that the victims were not random: they were involved in broadcasting or presenting the suicide of a junior college teacher. The teacher's unstable techno prodigy son, Owen Reilly, broke down and was admitted to a psychiatric hospital. When released, he decided to take revenge and prove a point: that the public's interest in the suffering of others is insatiable, as well as to wreak vengeance on those he felt had exploited his father's death.

The police raid Owen's house but he is not present. Owen has been following Jennifer because he is now obsessed with her. He captures and places Jennifer in a makeshift death trap: hanging her above a cultivator and progressively lowering her to her death as more people enter the website. Jennifer escapes by swinging out of the way and grabbing a pillar to pull herself onto the ground. She breaks free and pins down the murderer, fatally shooting Owen as the police arrive. Owen's death was being broadcast, just like his father's. Jennifer then displays her FBI badge to the webcam.

While the chatter in the website's chat room dwindles, statements are made such as "You go girl!", "glad the killer is dead" and another one saying "a genius died today". The final comment asks where the video can be downloaded.

Cast

 Diane Lane as FBI Agent Jennifer Marsh
 Colin Hanks as FBI Agent Griffin Dowd
 Billy Burke as Detective Eric Box
 Joseph Cross as Owen Reilly
 Mary Beth Hurt as Stella Marsh
 Tyrone Giordano as Tim Wilkes
 Perla Haney-Jardine as Annie Haskins
 Christopher Cousins as David Williams
 Tim De Zarn as Herbert Miller
 Peter Lewis as Richard Brooks
 Marilyn Deutsch as Marilyn Deutsch
 Jesse Tyler Ferguson as Arthur James Elmer
 Dax Jordan as Scotty Hillman
 John Breen as Richard Weymouth
 Brynn Baron as Mrs. Miller
 Phil Hamilton as Mr. Miller

Production

Filming
The film was shot in and around Portland, Oregon. A temporary studio was constructed in Clackamas, Oregon, where all non-location photography was done, mostly interiors, including the FBI's cyber division, Jennifer Marsh's house, the FBI building elevator, several basements, etc. A scene set on the east end of the Broadway Bridge was shot both on the actual bridge as well as at the studio. A faux diner was built underneath the Broadway bridge, which was used in the movie. The birthday party for Perla Haney-Jardine's character Annie was filmed in the roller skating rink of Oaks Amusement Park.

Release

Home media 
On May 13, 2008, Untraceable was released on DVD, Blu-ray and UMD. The DVD included an audio commentary and four featurettes.

Reception

Box office 
The film opened poorly, with an opening weekend of $11.3 million, below the $35 million budget. It grossed $53 million worldwide, on theatrical release.

Critical response 
Untraceable received negative reviews from critics. Review aggregation website Rotten Tomatoes gives the film a score of 16% based on 149 reviews, with the site's consensus being, "Despite Diane Lane's earnest effort, Untraceable manages to be nothing more than a run-of-the-mill thriller with a hypocritical message".

Several critics viewed the film as hypocritical for indulging in the "torture porn" it condemns. It also met criticism for its climax which was seen as devolving into horror film clichés. Lane was praised for her performance in the film. Roger Ebert gave the film a favorable review, giving the film a 3 star rating.

Peter Travers of Rolling Stone gave the film a strongly negative review, giving it zero stars.

References

External links

 
 
 
 
 

2008 films
2008 crime thriller films
2000s serial killer films
American crime thriller films
American police detective films
American serial killer films
Films about computing
Films about the Federal Bureau of Investigation
Films directed by Gregory Hoblit
Films produced by Gary Lucchesi
Films scored by Christopher Young
Films set in Portland, Oregon
Films shot in Portland, Oregon
Lakeshore Entertainment films
Screen Gems films
Films about snuff films
Techno-horror films
Techno-thriller films
Torture in films
2000s English-language films
2000s American films